Stephen Ross Shennan (born 7 January 1991) is a New Zealand-born Romanian rugby union player. He plays in the wing position for professional SuperLiga club Timișoara.

Club career

Shennan attended Kelston Boys' High School and previously played rugby league in his early career, representing the New Zealand Māori under-19s in 2009. A member of the Te Atatu Roosters club, Shennan was named the Auckland Rugby League's rookie of the year in 2009. He later signed for the New Zealand Warriors and played in their Toyota Cup winning under-20's side in 2011.

International career
He also plays for Romania's national team the Oaks, making his international debut at the 2014–16 European Nations Cup in a match against the Os Lobos.

References

External links

 Stephen Shennan at Timișoara Saracens website

1991 births
Living people
Romanian rugby union players
Romania international rugby union players
SCM Rugby Timișoara players
New Zealand rugby union players
Rugby union wings
New Zealand rugby league players
Te Atatu Roosters players
New Zealand Māori rugby league players
New Zealand Māori rugby union players
People educated at Kelston Boys' High School